Millgrove railway station was a private station on the Cleator and Workington Junction Railway (C&WJR) main line from  to . It appears to have served the Burnyeat family who lived at a house named Millgrove in Moresby, Cumbria, England, which was near the company's main line. William Burnyeat (1849-1921) was on the company's Board of Directors from 1900 to 1921.

The grid reference, latitude and longitude shown are interpreted from a large scale map showing the station.

The station is said to have been in use during the First World War.

Uncertainties
The station is referred to by McGowan Gradon and Robinson, but standard works, notably Butt, Croughton and Jowett, make no mention of the station; nor do regional works, notably Anderson, Marshall, and Suggitt. It is not mentioned in the company's May 1920 Working Time Table. Contemporary 6" OS Maps do not show the station or anything which suggests the remains of a station, though a minor road passes Millgrove and crosses the line nearby.

Nevertheless, the minutes of the C&WJR Board Meeting of 23 July 1903 refer to erecting an Up platform at Millgrove and extending the down platform.

History of the line
The line was one of the fruits of the rapid industrialisation of West Cumberland in the second half of the nineteenth century, being specifically born as a reaction to oligopolistic behaviour by the London and North Western and Whitehaven, Cleator and Egremont Railways. The line opened to passengers on 1 October 1879.

All lines in the area were primarily aimed at mineral traffic, notably iron ore, coal and limestone, none more so than the new line to Workington, which earned the local name "The Track of the Ironmasters". General goods and passenger services were provided, but were very small beer compared with mineral traffic.

The founding Act of Parliament of June 1878 confirmed the company's agreement with the Furness Railway that the latter would operate the line for one third of the receipts.

Like any business tied to one or few industries, the railway was at the mercy of trade fluctuations and technological change. The Cumberland iron industry led the charge in the nineteenth century, but became less and less competitive as time passed and local ore became worked out and harder to win, taking the fortunes of the railway with it. The peak year was 1909, when 1,644,514 tons of freight were handled. Ominously for the line, that tonnage was down to just over 800,000 by 1922, bringing receipts of £83,349, compared with passenger fares totalling £6,570.

Rundown and closure
The peak year for tonnage was 1909, and for progress was 1913, with the opening of the Harrington and Lowca line for passenger traffic. A chronology of the line's affairs from 1876 to 1992 has almost no entries before 1914 which fail to include "opened" or "commenced". After 1918 the position was reversed, when the litany of step-by-step closures and withdrawals was relieved only by a control cabin and a signalbox being erected in 1919 and the Admiralty saving the northern extension in 1937 by establishing an armaments depot at Broughton.

Millgrove station had closed by 1921 Normal passenger traffic ended along the line in 1931.

An enthusiasts' special ran through on 6 September 1954, the only one to do so using main line passenger stock. The next such train to traverse any C&WJR metals did so in 1966 at the north end of the line, three years after the line through Moresby Parks closed.

Afterlife
By 2013 aerial images clearly show the line of route and that the area to the west of the station site had been transformed by housing.

See also

 Maryport and Carlisle Railway
 Furness Railway
 Whitehaven, Cleator and Egremont Railway
 Cockermouth and Workington Railway

References

Sources

Further reading

External links
Map of the CWJR with photos RAILSCOT
Map of the WC&ER with photos RAILSCOT
The station Rail Map Online
The approximate station site on overlain OS maps surveyed from 1898 National Library of Scotland
The station area on a 1948 OS Map npe maps
The line railwaycodes
The railways of Cumbria Cumbrian Railways Association
Photos of Cumbrian railways Cumbrian Railways Association
The railways of Cumbria Railways_of_Cumbria
Cumbrian Industrial History, via Cumbria Industrial History Society
Furness Railtour using many West Cumberland lines 5 September 1954 sixbellsjunction
A video tour-de-force of the region's closed lines cumbriafilmarchive
1882 RCH Diagram showing the station, see page 173 of the pdf google
Haematite earthminerals
Coal and iron ore mining in Cleator Moor Haig Pit
The Adamsons and Burnyeats of Millgrove landedfamilies
William Burnyeat as Newspaper Board Chairman, via Whitehaven News

Disused railway stations in Cumbria
Railway stations in Great Britain opened in 1903
Railway stations in Great Britain closed in 1921
Private railway stations
Former Cleator and Workington Junction Railway stations